The Bayfront Parkway is a highway in Erie, Pennsylvania, in the United States, primarily running along the shore of Lake Erie's Presque Isle Bay. Carrying the state quadrant route designation of State Route 4034 
(SR 4034), it continues as Interstate 79 (I-79) on the western end and the Bayfront Connector, part of Pennsylvania Route 290 (PA 290), on the eastern end.

Route description
The Bayfront Parkway begins at the northern terminus of I-79 in the city of Erie in Erie County, heading east-northeast as a four-lane undivided road designated as SR 4034. The road passes through commercial areas and turns north, narrowing to three lanes with one eastbound lane and two westbound lanes. The Bayfront Parkway heads east of Frontier Park, where it becomes paralleled by the Bayfront Bikeway to the west of the road, and curves northeast, passing under PA 5 Alt. without an interchange. The road becomes three lanes with a center left-turn lane and turns east-northeast to follow the south shore of Presque Isle Bay, running between a marina to the north and residential areas to the south. The Bayfront Parkway continues along the bay and becomes a two-lane road, passing between bayfront development including the Bayfront Convention Center to the north and commercial areas in downtown Erie to the south. The road comes to a bridge over a CSX railroad line at the State Street junction, with the railroad line running parallel to the south, and passes between the Erie Maritime Museum to the north and the UPMC Hamot hospital to the south. After intersecting Holland Street, the Bayfront Parkway heads south of the Erie Intermodal Transportation Center serving Erie Metropolitan Transit Authority buses and crosses a railroad spur from the CSX line. The road runs between industrial areas to the north and residential areas to the south and crosses another railroad spur. The roadway heads away from the parallel CSX tracks and widens to four lanes, running northeast between the Erie Wastewater Treatment Plant to the north and the site of Fort Presque Isle to the south. Bayfront Parkway comes to an intersection with Port Access Road and East Bay Drive, at which point Bayfront Parkway and the parallel Bayfront Bikeway turn southeast to head away from Presque Isle Bay. The road crosses a CSX railroad spur and becomes parallel to a CSX railroad line located southwest of the road. The roadway heads through residential areas with some commercial development and intersects PA 5 Alt. The Bayfront Parkway ends at a junction with PA 5/PA 290, at which point the road continues southeast as PA 290 (Bayfront Connector).

History

The Bayfront Parkway was built at the end of the 20th century primarily along old railroad right-of-way. The section west of State Street was built first. This section is named the Italo S. Cappabianca Memorial Highway.

 a project on the Bayfront Parkway is underway "to improve the pedestrian, bicycle, transit, and passenger vehicle connection of the Erie Central Business District and adjacent neighborhoods to the waterfront property north of the Bayfront Parkway (SR 4034), to reduce crashes as much as practical on the Bayfront Parkway, to improve future congestion to an acceptable level of service or delay, and to improve traffic operations and efficiency." The improvements include roundabouts and an interchange.

Major intersections

References

External links
 Bayfront Parkway at Pennsylvania Highways

Quadrant routes in Pennsylvania
Expressways in the United States
Transportation in Erie, Pennsylvania
Transportation in Erie County, Pennsylvania
Parkways in the United States